Tackle Happy is an Australian documentary film released in 2000 about the live performance show Puppetry of the Penis starring Simon Morley and David Friend. It was produced and directed by comedian Mick Molloy, whose radio show Martin/Molloy had chronicled the chaotic 1998 tour captured in the film. Tackle Happy also features guest appearances by Stephen Curry, Paul Hester, Tony Martin, Andrew Denton, Amanda Keller, Pete Smith and Jimeoin.

See also
List of Australian films

References

External links
 
Tackle Happy at the National Film and Sound Archive

2000 films
Australian documentary films
2000s English-language films